5 Trianguli is a solitary star located in the northern constellation Triangulum. With an apparent magnitude of 6.23, it’s barely visible to the naked eye under ideal conditions. The star is located 399 light years away from the Solar System, but is drifting away with a radial velocity of 7.7 km/s.

5 Trianguli has a classification of A0 Vm, which states it’s an A-type main-sequence star with unusually strong metallic lines. It has 2.22 times the mass of the Sun and 2.96 times the radius of the Sun. 5 Trianguli radiates at 48 solar luminosities from its photosphere at an effective temperature of 8,836 kelvin, which gives it a white-hue of an A-type star. It has a low projected rotational velocity of 15 km/s, common for Am stars.

References

Stars
A-type main-sequence stars
Am stars
Triangulum (constellation)
Trianguli, 5
0634
010220
013372